Tim Fairbrother (born 12 March 1982 in Upper Hutt, New Zealand), is a rugby union player, his position is tighthead prop.

Fairbrother featured through the New Zealand rugby junior representative team setup and made his first class debut for local Province Wellington at just 19. Two years later he was called up to play for Regional side the Hurricanes in the then Super 14. Fairbrother played for the Hurricanes for seven years but was plagued by injury, including missing almost the entire 2007 Super Rugby season, and was unable to break into the All Blacks squad.

In 2009 Fairbrother left New Zealand for Australia, signing for the Western Force on a two-year contract.  Tim is qualified to play for Australia (and England) through his grandparents but was not selected by the Wallabies coaches and, feeling he had "[given] it [his] best crack", decided to move on again joining Harlequins.

Fairbrother was the most experienced front row player at Harlequins. He came off the bench in the first round of the 2011–12 Aviva Premiership and proceeded to start in the following 5 games, but his season was interrupted by injury twice and he missed the last three months the season.

Following the first round of the 2012–13 season Harlequins announced that the club had agreed to release Fairbrother from his contract to allow him to return to New Zealand.

References

1982 births
Harlequin F.C. players
Living people
Sportspeople from Upper Hutt
New Zealand rugby union players
Hurricanes (rugby union) players
Wellington rugby union players
Western Force players
Rugby union props
New Zealand expatriate rugby union players
New Zealand expatriate sportspeople in Australia
New Zealand expatriate sportspeople in England
Expatriate rugby union players in Australia
Expatriate rugby union players in England
Rugby union players from the Wellington Region